Honjō Station is the name of three train stations in Japan:

 Honjō Station (Fukuoka) (本城駅)
 Honjō Station (Saitama) (本庄駅)
 Honjō Station (Fukui) (本荘駅)

See also
 Kinshichō Station - formerly (between 1894 and 1915) called Honjo Station (本所駅)